Kos is a Greek island.

Kos may also refer to:


People
 Kos (surname), a Slavic surname, common in Slovenia, Croatia and Poland, includes a list of people with the surname
 Kos, nickname for Markos Moulitsas (born 1971), founder of the Daily Kos blog
 Kos, nickname of UFC welterweight fighter Josh Koscheck (born 1977)

Places
 Kos (regional unit), a regional unit of Greece
 Kos (village), Bulgaria
 Koš, Slovakia, a village and municipality
 Kos Manor, a 16th-century mansion in Jesenice, Slovenia

Military
 , ex-British BYMS-class minesweeper HMS BYMS 2191, transferred to Greece and renamed Kos in 1943, sunk in 1944
 , a tank landing ship, originally USS Whitfield County, sold to Greece in 1977

Other uses
 Kos (unit), an ancient Indian measure of distance, approximately two miles
 Aero A.34 Kos, a Czech touring plane of the 1930s
 PZL-102 Kos, a Polish two-seat touring and training monoplane introduced in 1959
 Kos, a fictional deity from the 2015 video game Bloodborne
 Kosraean language ISO 639-2 and -3 codes

See also
 Daily Kos, an American political blog
 k-os, stage name of Canadian musician Kevin Brereton (born 1972)
 KOS (disambiguation)
 Cos (disambiguation)
 Kaus (disambiguation)